Acleris hokkaidana is a species of moth of the family Tortricidae. It is found in Japan (Hokkaido).

The length of the forewings is about 11 mm. The forewings are brown with rusty scales. The hindwings are pale greyish brown.

References

Moths described in 1964
hokkaidana
Moths of Japan